The 1994 Guia Touring car race of Macau held on 20 November 1994, was a motorsport championship for Super Touring racing cars forming a race of the 1994 Asia-Pacific Touring Car Championship. This winner of the two combined races was Joachim Winkelhock who drove for Schnitzer Motorsport.

Teams and drivers
Teams and drivers list:

Race results

Race 1

Race 2

Overall results

References
 Entry List
 Race part 1 via Youtube
 Race part 2 via Youtube
 Race part 4 via Youtube
 Race part 5 via Youtube

Macau Grand Prix
1994 in motorsport
1994 in Macau sport